Noya may refer to:
Noia, a municipality of the pronvice of A Coruña, Galicia, Spain
Noia (comarca), a division of the pronvice of A Coruña, Galicia, Spain
Noya Department, a department of Estuaire Province, Gabon
Noya River, a river in Gabon and Equatorial Guinea
Noya (given name), given name meaning "divine beauty"
Noya Station, a railway station in Japan

Persons with the surname
Constantino Noya (playing in 1930), Bolivian footballer
Francisco Javier Gómez Noya (born 1983), Spanish triathlete
Maria Magnani Noya, (1931–2011), Italian lawyer and politician
 Nippy Noya (born 1946), Indonesian percussionist
 Rodrigo Noya (born 1993), Argentinian actor